was an entrepreneur, politician and cabinet minister in the pre-war Empire of Japan.

Biography
Noda was from a wealthy farming family of Takata, Fukuoka (currently part of the city of Miyama, Fukuoka Prefecture). In his youth, he worked in the Miike Coal Mines, following which he obtained a position at the Miike Bank, both owned by the Mitsui zaibatsu. He became active in politics, supporting the Freedom and People's Rights Movement, serving in the Fukuoka Prefectural Assembly in 1886. He was elected to the Lower House of the Diet of Japan in the March 1898 General Election, and was subsequently re-elected a total of nine times. As an entrepreneur, he founded the Miike Civil Engineering Company, and was one of the founding members of the South Manchurian Railway in 1906. He was secretary-general of the Rikken Seiyūkai political party in 1912, and became vice president of the Oriental Development Company in 1913. While vice president of the Oriental Development Company, Noda advised the Diet that the number of Japanese agricultural emigrants to Korea would reach 500,000 by the year 1920, however, the actual numbers eventually turned out to be only a small fraction of this number.

Noda served as Minister of Communications from 1918-1922 under the Hara and Takahashi administrations. He subsequently served as Minister of Commerce and Industry under the Katō Tomosaburō administration in 1925.

Noda was also a poet, noted for the nationalistic themes in his works, and was a close correspondent with Tōyama Mitsuru and Nakano Seigō, with whom he cooperated in the creation of the Kokushikan University in 1917.

References

External links

National Diet Library Bio and Photo

Notes

1853 births
1927 deaths
People from Miyama, Fukuoka
Politicians from Fukuoka Prefecture
Government ministers of Japan
Members of the House of Peers (Japan)
Rikken Seiyūkai politicians
Members of the House of Representatives (Empire of Japan)